Panties (in American English; also called underpants, undies, or knickers in British English) are a form of underwear worn traditionally by women. Panties can be form-fitting or loose. Typical components include an elastic waistband, a crotch panel to cover the genitalia (usually lined with absorbent material such as cotton), and a pair of leg openings that, like the waistband, are often made of elastomer. Various materials are used, but are usually chosen to be breathable.

Panties are made of a variety of materials, including cotton, lace, latex, leather, lycra, mesh, nylon, PVC, polyester, rawhide, satin, and silk. Construction typically consists of two pieces (front and rear) that are joined by seams at the crotch and sides; an additional gusset is often in the crotch, with the waistband and leg-openings made from elastomer.

History
The earliest known use of underwear that resembles modern panties dates back to 4,400 B.C. during the Badari period in Egypt.

Terminology
In the United Kingdom, Ireland, South Africa, Malaysia, Singapore and occasionally in other Commonwealth countries such as Australia and New Zealand, panties may be referred to as "undies", "knickers", or simply underwear. The last of which is a gender neutral term and can be used for either male or female underwear bottoms, the American English equivalent being underpants. "Knickers" can also refer to male underwear, while the word panties generally refers only to female underwear. In Australia, male underpants are often referred to as "undies", although the word can also refer to panties.

Styles 

Panties are classified into various styles based on criteria such as the amount of rear coverage, width at the sides and height at which they are worn. These categories are not necessarily distinct and usage may vary somewhat among brands:

 Adhesive panties are sometimes described as strapless/stick-on panties. They are a form of micro-panties that cover the bare minimum parts on the front and back. They are useful when women do not want the panty line to be visible.
 Bikinis, like hipsters, sit at hip level, but the fabric of the side sections is narrower. With the string bikini type, the side sections disappear altogether and the waistband consists of only string-like material. There may be less rear coverage with the bikini style.
 Boyshorts cover the hips and are named for their similarity to boxer briefs, a variation on boxer shorts. Some resemble men's briefs, complete with fly and contrast trim. Unlike men's briefs, this style is usually lower cut. Boy shorts often cover most of the buttocks.
 Briefs rise to the waist, or just below the navel, and have full coverage in the rear.
 Classic briefs, sometimes called "granny panties" because they were the standard underpants in previous decades and have a connotation of being worn by older women. The waistband sits very high on the waist. The leg holes are small so the underwear cover as much area between waist and thigh as possible. 
 Control briefs are designed to offer support while giving a slimmer appearance. This type usually contains a stretch material such as spandex and may extend above the waist. Some have an extra firm panel to flatten the tummy. Some also compress the buttocks, while other control briefs are designed to avoid compression of the buttocks. Others merely lift the buttocks and have holes cut out for maximum fullness of the buttocks. 
 High-cut briefs are designed with larger leg holes and narrower sides to show off more leg and allow more freedom of movement.
 Cheekies can be styled as a hipster, bikini, or boyshort in the front, but in the rear, they are designed to hug the buttocks, and have a seam or runching to make the fabric sit partially between the cheeks to accentuate the shape. They leave the outer 1/3 to 1/2 of each cheek exposed and often have a lace or scalloped trim. 
 Hipsters are worn lower down on the body, with the waistband straight across the hips.
 Tangas provide a moderate to minimal coverage with back coverage that is less than a bikini, and the waistband is reduced to a narrow strip at the sides. 
 The G-string has a vertical string at the back, which connects the crotch to the waistband, sometimes featuring a triangle of fabric which is the part that is sometimes referred to as a whaletail when it peeks out above the waistband of low riding pants. 
 The T-front is a type of G-string in which the string also reaches the front part. It provides almost no coverage while still maintaining the basic hygienic underwear functions and covering only the genitalia. Usually it is built by strings only, sometimes with more fabric or lace around the waist. 
 Thongs have a waistband similar to tangas, but the rear coverage is mostly cut away. The crotch is triangle-shaped, as it narrows to a thin strip toward the back and sits between the buttocks, becoming wider towards the top where it connects to the waistband.

See also

 Briefs
 French knickers
 Leggings
 Leg warmers 
 Tights
 Lingerie
 No Pants Day
 Pantalettes
 Pantyhose
 Teddy
 Undergarment
 Underpants
 Underwear as outerwear
 Underwear fetishism
 Whale tail

References

External links

 

Lingerie
Women's clothing